Gordon Boulevard may refer to:
 Virginia State Route 123, named Gordon Boulevard through Prince William County, Virginia, United States
 , a Ukrainian newspaper founded by Dmitry Gordon